Mulberry is an unincorporated community in Autauga County, Alabama, United States.

Notes

Unincorporated communities in Autauga County, Alabama
Unincorporated communities in Alabama